Sericocrambus is a genus of moths of the family Crambidae. It contains only one species, Sericocrambus stylatus, which is found in Uruguay.

References

Natural History Museum Lepidoptera genus database

Crambini
Monotypic moth genera
Moths of South America
Crambidae genera
Taxa named by Hans Daniel Johan Wallengren